Brian Thomas Pert (born 28 January 1936) is a former Australian rules footballer who played for Fitzroy in the VFL.

Family
The son of Thomas Arthur Pert (1905-1961), and Grace Dorothy Pert (1905-1994), née Condick, Brian Thomas Pert was born on 28 January 1936.

He married Valerie Thelma Ballantyne (1938-) in 1960.

His son Gary was a best and fairest winner with Fitzroy.

Football
Cleared from Preston Scouts to Fitzroy in April 1953, Pert usually played at half-back or as a wingman. He missed many games due to injury and despite spending 12 seasons with Fitzroy he managed to play only 125 games.

Saturday, 6 July 1963
On 6 July 1963, playing on the half-back flank, he was a member of the young and inexperienced Fitzroy team that comprehensively and unexpectedly defeated Geelong, 9.13 (67) to 3.13 (31) in the 1963 Miracle Match. Pert was declared the "best on ground" for his outstanding performance in the match.

See also
 1963 Miracle Match

Notes

External links
 
 

1936 births
Australian rules footballers from Victoria (Australia)
Fitzroy Football Club players
Living people